Thomas A Pearsall (born 18 May 1943) is a former English cricketer.  Pearsall was a left-handed batsman who was a right-arm bowler, but his bowling style is unknown.  He was born in West Bromwich, Staffordshire.

Pearsall made his debut for Staffordshire in the 1974 Minor Counties Championship against Shropshire.  Pearsall played Minor counties cricket for Staffordshire from 1974 to 1981, which included 29 Minor Counties Championship matches.  In 1975, he made his List A debut for Staffordshire against Leicestershire in the Gillette Cup.  He made 2 further appearances in List A cricket for the county, against Devon in the 1st round of the 1978 Gillette Cup and Sussex in the 2nd round of the same competition.  In his 3 List A matches for the county, he scored 49 runs at an average of 16.33, with a high score of 34.  He later made 2 List A appearances for the Minor Counties North in the 1979 Benson & Hedges Cup against Middlesex and Kent.  In these matches, he scored 17 runs at an average of 8.50, with a high score of 9.

References

External links
Thomas Pearsall at ESPNcricinfo
Thomas Pearsall at CricketArchive

1943 births
Living people
Sportspeople from West Bromwich
English cricketers
Staffordshire cricketers
Minor Counties cricketers